Marcia Robinson Martel is an American politician who has served in the Vermont House of Representatives since 2015.

References

Living people
21st-century American politicians
21st-century American women politicians
Republican Party members of the Vermont House of Representatives
Women state legislators in Vermont
Year of birth missing (living people)